These are some of C.F. Pachuca Records from 1901 to the present day.

Pachuca's Historic Table in Primera División ( 1943-Clausura 2012)

Most League Appearances
(players in bold are still active)

Most League Minutes Played

Most Sub Appearances'

Most Career League Goals

Most Career League Assists

Most Career League Yellow Cards

Most Career League Red Cards

C.F. Pachuca